Arthur Ewart Clair Atkinson (May 26, 1892 – September 29, 1967) was a Canadian politician. He served in the Legislative Assembly of New Brunswick as member of the Conservative party representing Sunbury County from 1925 to 1935.

References

20th-century Canadian legislators
1892 births
1967 deaths
Progressive Conservative Party of New Brunswick MLAs